Harisena was a tenth century Digambara monk. His origin is traced to those monks who had stayed in the north during the supposed famine and had been prevailed upon by their lay followers to cover their private parts with a strip of cloth (ardhaphalaka) while begging for alms.

He wrote Brhatkathakosha in 932 AD. The text talks about the stupas in Mathura being erected by devas during controversies with Buddhists.

Notes

References
 
 

Indian Jain monks
10th-century Indian Jain writers
10th-century Jain monks
10th-century Indian monks